John Schlarman (May 1, 1975 – November 12, 2020) was an American football offensive line coach from 2013 to 2020 for the Kentucky Wildcats football team, as well as from 2000 to 2002. He also coached the offensive line for the Troy Trojans football team from 2007 to 2012. 
In early August 2018, Schlarman was diagnosed with stage 4 cholangiocarcinoma, a rare form of cancer in the bile ducts. Schlarman died in 2020, after succumbing to his condition at the age of 45.

References

Kentucky Wildcats football coaches
Troy Trojans football coaches
1975 births
2020 deaths
People from Fort Thomas, Kentucky
Deaths from cholangiocarcinoma
Deaths from cancer in Kentucky